The Ambassador of the United Kingdom to Laos is the United Kingdom's foremost diplomatic representative to the Lao People's Democratic Republic. After autonomy from France in 1949, the post was initially carried out on a non-resident basis in conjunction with British Ambassador to Vietnam. From 1955 until 1985 there was a full Ambassador to the Republic, then until 2012 the post was combined with that of British Ambassador to Thailand. The official title is His Britannic Majesty's Ambassador to the Lao People's Democratic Republic or HMA Vientiane. From October 2012, the United Kingdom once again has a resident Ambassador in Vientiane.

Non-resident Ambassador to Laos (and Ambassador to Vietnam) 
 1951–(1955): Sir Hubert Graves

Ambassador to Laos 
 1954–1956: The Lord Talbot de Malahide 
 1956–1958: Leonard Holliday 
 1958–1960: Sir Anthony Lincoln 
 1960–1962: Sir John Addis 
 1962–1965: Sir Donald Hopson 
 1965–1967: Sir Frederick Warner 
 1967–1970: Sir Harold Smedley 
 1970–1973: John Lloyd 
 1973–1975: Alan Davidson 
 1976–1978: Donald Cape 
 1978–1980: John Stewart 
 1982–1985: Bernard Dobbs

Non-resident Ambassador to Laos (and Ambassador to Thailand) 
 (1981)–1986: Justin Staples 
 1986–1989: Derek Tonkin 
 1989–1992: Sir Ramsay Melhuish 
 1992–1996: Christian Adams 
 1996–2000: Sir James Hodge 
 2000–2003: Barney Smith 

 2003–2007: David Fall 
 2007–2010: Quinton Quayle
 2010–2012: Asif Ahmad

Ambassador to Laos 
 2012–2015: Philip Malone
 2015–2019: Hugh Evans

 2019–: John Pearson

References

External links 
 UK and Laos, gov.uk

Laos
 
United Kingdom